Tara Anne Cassandra Fitzgerald (born 18 September 1967) is an English actress who has appeared in feature films, television, radio and the stage. She won the New York Drama Desk Award for Outstanding Featured Actress in a Play in 1995 as Ophelia in Hamlet. She won the Best Actress Award at The Reims International Television Festival in 1999 for her role of Lady Dona St Columb in Frenchman's Creek. Fitzgerald has appeared in the West End production of The Misanthrope at the Comedy Theatre, and in Henrik Ibsen's A Doll's House at the Donmar Warehouse. Since 2007, Fitzgerald has appeared in more than 30 episodes of the BBC television series Waking the Dead and played the role of Selyse Baratheon in the HBO series Game of Thrones.

Early life
Fitzgerald is the daughter of artist Michael Callaby and Irish portrait photographer Sarah Geraldine Fitzgerald. She spent part of her childhood in the Bahamas, where her maternal grandfather ran a law firm. Her sister, Arabella, was born there. Following the family's return to England when she was three, Fitzgerald's parents separated, and her mother then married the Irish actor Norman Rodway. She has a half-sister from this marriage, Bianca Rodway. Her father, Callaby, died when she was 11. Her great-aunt was actress Geraldine Fitzgerald; other cousins through the Fitzgerald family are the Irish novelist Jennifer Johnston and Irish actress Susan Fitzgerald.

Career

Film
Following her graduation from Drama Centre London, Fitzgerald appeared as the daughter of a beauty queen in the comedy Hear My Song (1991). She came to international attention in 1993 when she starred with Hugh Grant in the Australian comedy Sirens. The film landed Fitzgerald an Australian Film Institute nomination for Best Actress in a Lead Role. Two years later she again appeared with Grant in the comedy The Englishman who Went up a Hill but Came down a Mountain. Fitzgerald appeared in a steady stream of independent feature films through the 1990s and 2000s, among them A Man of No Importance (1994), Brassed Off (1996), the Czech World War II fighter pilot drama Dark Blue World (2001), and the 2004 drama, Secret Passage (UK title: The Lion's Mouth), set during the Spanish Inquisition. In 2006, she appeared in In a Dark Place, and, in 2014, she played Miriam in Exodus: Gods and Kings.

Fitzgerald decided to expand her career into directing after becoming frustrated with what she saw as a lack of interesting roles for older actresses. She was one of 12 filmmakers selected for Film London's 2015 Microwave scheme, which provides training and mentoring to filmmakers who then pitch their ideas to a panel that selects the two best ideas for production, with budgets of £150,000 each.

Stage
Fitzgerald's first major stage role came in 1992 when she appeared opposite Peter O'Toole in Our Song at the Apollo Theatre. She has alternated between stage and screen for almost two decades, with frequent theatre roles. In 1995, she starred as Ophelia in Hamlet at London's Almeida Theatre, which led to her American stage debut. The production transferred across the Atlantic and played more than 90 performances on Broadway at the Belasco Theatre.

Since then, she has played Antigone in a national UK tour and Blanche Du Bois in Tennessee Williams's A Streetcar Named Desire at the Bristol Old Vic and appeared in A Doll's House at the Donmar Warehouse. Fitzgerald has also appeared in Molière's The Misanthrope in 2009 at the Comedy Theatre (now the Pinter). She appeared in The Winters Tale at the RSC in 2013, performed as Lady Macbeth at Shakespeare's Globe theatre and appeared in Gaslight at the Royal and Derngate Theatre in 2015.

Television
A veteran of more than twenty television programmes and mini-series, Fitzgerald has portrayed Victorian heroines and modern police detectives. Her first TV role was in the 1991 BBC production The Black Candle, set in Yorkshire in the 1880s. In 1992, she was featured in The Camomile Lawn. After her feature film success, she landed her first starring role in a television film, The Vacillations of Poppy Carew. She won Best Actress at the 1999 Reims International Television Festival for the costumes-and-pirates love story Frenchman's Creek. In 2006, she was featured in The Virgin Queen, before taking on the role of Eve Lockhart on Waking The Dead, joining that cast in 2007. She also had a recurring role on Game of Thrones, playing Selyse Baratheon. In 2020 Tara Fitzgerald played a role as Lady Templemore in the ITV-series Belgravia, a historical drama based on the 2016 novel of the same name by Julian Fellowes.

Personal life

In 2001, Fitzgerald married the English actor-director John Sharian, who directed her in the short film The Snatching of Bookie Bob. They separated in May 2003 and later divorced.

Fitzgerald lives in London.

Filmography

Film

Television

Theatre

Video games

References

External links
 
 
 Tara Fitzgerald interview in The Sunday Times 2017

1967 births
Living people
Actresses from London
Alumni of the Drama Centre London
British expatriates in the Bahamas
Drama Desk Award winners
English film actresses
English stage actresses
English television actresses
English people of Irish descent
People from Cuckfield
20th-century English actresses
21st-century English actresses
Actresses from Sussex
English radio actresses
English voice actresses
English video game actresses